Jinnah Tower is a landmark monument in the city of Guntur in Andhra Pradesh. It is named after the founder of Pakistan, 
Muhammad Ali Jinnah and is located on Mahatma Gandhi Road of the city. It is being re-painted to tricolor and renamed because of the controversy regarding Jinnah being the founder of Pakistan should not be stated in India.

Structure

The tower was erected on six pillars which open to a dome, typical of the then Muslim architecture in early twentieth century. The tower is currently in a state of neglect and crumbling. According to the State Archaeology Department, the tower could be brought under the list of protected monuments if it has history of more than 60 years.

Origins

About its origins, one story is that a representative of Jinnah, Judaliyaquat Ali Khan, visited Guntur in the pre-Independence era. Khan was felicitated by Lal Jan, the grandfather of the former Rajya Sabha member, S. M. Laljan Basha and current advisor to the Government of Andhra Pradesh Minorities welfare department, S.M. Ziauddin. He is said to have built a tower to commemorate the leader of the Muslim League.

According to another narrative, two Municipal Chairmen, Nadimpalli Narasimha Rao and Tellakula Jalayya were responsible during their respective terms of office for the construction of the tower — as a symbol of peace and harmony.

References 

Tourist attractions in Guntur
Monuments and memorials in Andhra Pradesh
Memorials to Muhammad Ali Jinnah
Towers in India
Buildings and structures in Guntur